Events from the year 1800 in France.

Incumbents
 The French Consulate

Events
January - Constitutional Referendum held which ratifies a new constitution.
13 February - Foundation of the Banque de France.
6 April - Siege of Genoa begins, with the Austrians besieging the French garrison.
3 May - Battle of Engen, French victory over Austrian forces.
3 May - Battle of Stockach, French victory.
15 May - Battle of Erbach, French victory with heavy casualties on both sides.
15 May - Napoleon Bonaparte crosses the Alps and invades Italy.
4 June - Siege of Genoa ends in a tactical victory for Austria.
9 June - Battle of Montebello, French victory.
14 June - Battle of Marengo, French victory, driving the Austrians out of Italy.
19 June - Battle of Höchstädt, French victory.
5 September - At the invitation of the Maltese, British troops liberate the Islands of Malta and Gozo from the French.
30 September - The Convention of 1800 (Treaty of Mortefontaine), signed between the United States and France, ends the Quasi-War.
1 October - Third Treaty of San Ildefonso, secretly negotiated between France and Spain, by which Spain returns the colonial territory of Louisiana to France.
10 October - Conspiration des poignards, conspiracy to assassinate Napoleon Bonaparte, which is prevented.
12 October - Boston-Berceau Action: The United States captures a French ship.
3 December - Battle of Hohenlinden, decisive French victory over Austrian forces.
24 December - Plot of the Rue Saint-Nicaise, assassination attempt on Napoleon Bonaparte in Paris.
25 December - Battle of Pozzolo: French victory.

Births

January to June
3 January - Etienne-Michel Faillon, Roman Catholic historian (died 1870)
12 January - Eugène Lami, painter and lithographer (died 1890)
6 February - Achille Devéria, painter and lithographer (died 1857)
12 March - Louis Prosper Gachard, man of letters (died 1885)
25 March - Alexis Paulin Paris, scholar and author (died 1881)
13 April - Princess Elisabeth of Savoy-Carignan (died 1856)
5 May - Louis Christophe François Hachette, publisher (died 1864)
8 May - Armand Carrel, writer (died 1836)
12 May - Jean-Félix Adolphe Gambart, astronomer (died 1836)
30 May - Henri-Marie-Gaston Boisnormand de Bonnechose, Cardinal (died 1883)

July to December
14 July - Jean-Baptiste Dumas, chemist (died 1884)
31 July - Louis Viardot, writer, art historian and critic, theatrical figure, hispanophile and translator (died 1883)
28 July - Frédérick Lemaître, actor and playwright (died 1876)
12 August - Jean-Jacques Ampère, philologist and man of letters (died 1864)
26 August - Félix Archimède Pouchet, naturalist (died 1872)
12 September - Pierre Charles Fournier de Saint-Amant, chess master (died 1872)
22 September - Jean Louis Lassaigne, chemist (died 1859)
8 October - Jules Desnoyers, geologist and archaeologist (died 1887)
23 October - Henri Milne-Edwards, zoologist (died 1885)
25 October - Jacques Paul Migne, priest, theologian and publisher (died 1875)
1 November - Charles Antoine Lemaire, botanist and botanical author (died 1871)
17 November - Achille Fould, financier and politician (died 1867)
22 November - Jules Bastide, publicist (died 1879)
10 December - Philippe Ricord, physician (died 1889)
28 December - Jean-Pierre Dantan, sculptor (died 1869)

Full date unknown
Auguste Belloc, photographer (died 1867)
Ximénès Doudan, journalist (died 1872)
Jean Louis Marie Eugène Durieu, photographer (died 1874)
Charles Auguste Désiré Filon, historian (died 1875)
Nicolas Remy Maire, bow maker (died 1878)
Jacques-François Ochard, painter (died 1870)

Deaths

January to March
1 January - Louis-Jean-Marie Daubenton, naturalist (born 1716)
9 January - Jean Étienne Championnet, General (born 1762)
18 February - Jean-Baptiste Perrée, Admiral (born 1761)
27 February - Princess Marie Adélaïde of France (born 1732)
16 March - Jean-Joseph Casot, Jesuit in Canada (born 1728)
29 March - Marc René, marquis de Montalembert, military engineer and writer (born 1714)
March - Joseph de Guignes, orientalist and sinologist (born 1721)

April to June
19 April - Jean Antoine Marbot, general and politician (born 1754)
4 May - Armand, duc d'Aiguillon, nobleman (born 1750)
7 May - Jean-Baptiste Vallin de la Mothe, architect (born 1729)
10 May - Jacques Mallet du Pan, journalist (born 1749)
14 June - Louis Charles Antoine Desaix, General (born 1768)
14 June - Jean Baptiste Kléber, General (born 1753)
18 June - Francis V of Beauharnais, nobleman, soldier, politician, colonial governor and admiral (born 1714)
28 June - Théophile Corret de la Tour d'Auvergne, Military officer and antiquarian (born 1743)

July to December
2 July - Victor Louis, architect (born 1731)
12 August - Anne-Catherine de Ligniville, Madame Helvétius, maintained a renowned salon (born 1722)
18 August - Charles Louis L'Héritier de Brutelle, botanist and magistrate (born 1746)
13 September - Claude Martin, military officer in French and British armies (born 1735)
23 September - Dominique de La Rochefoucauld, Cardinal (born 1712)
27 September - Hyacinthe Jadin, composer (born 1776)
14 November - François Claude Amour, marquis de Bouillé, General (born 1739)
December - Jean-Baptiste Audebert, artist and naturalist (born 1759)

Full date unknown
François-Nicolas Martinet, engraver and naturalist (b. c.1760)
André-Robert Andréa de Nerciat, novelist (born 1739)

See also

References

1800s in France